Robert Marie Jean Victor de Boissonneaux de Chevigny (2 August 1920 – 11 June 2011) was a French bishop of the Roman Catholic Church.

Chevigny was born in Besançon, France and was ordained a priest on 3 October 1948 in the Holy Ghost Fathers. He was appointed Bishop of the Diocese of Nouakchott on 21 December 1973 and ordained on 23 February 1974. Chevigny retired from the Diocese of Nouakchott on 10 July 1995.

External links
Catholic Hierarchy

1920 births
2011 deaths
French Roman Catholic bishops in Africa
20th-century Roman Catholic bishops in Mauritania
20th-century French Roman Catholic bishops
Roman Catholic bishops of Nouakchott
Mauritanian Roman Catholic bishops